Yevhen (Evgeni) Borysovych Kholoniuk (born 12 July 1990) is a Ukrainian former competitive ice dancer. With Maria Nosulia, he is the 2011 JGP Volvo Cup (Latvia) champion. Their partnership ended after the 2011–12 season. In 2012, Kholoniuk teamed up with the German single skater Kavita Lorenz, with whom he won the bronze medal at the 2013 German Championships. He has worked as a skating coach in Kyiv.

Programs 
(with Nosulia)

Competitive highlights 
JGP: Junior Grand Prix

With Lorenz

With Nosulia

References

External links 

 

Ukrainian male ice dancers
1990 births
Living people
Sportspeople from Kyiv